Stygobromus smithi, the Alabama well amphipod,  is a species of crustacean in family Crangonyctidae. It is endemic to the United States.

References

Crustaceans of the United States
smithi
Crustaceans described in 1943
Taxonomy articles created by Polbot
Taxobox binomials not recognized by IUCN